Nicola Sharon French (born 26 September 1964) is an English singer. She is best known for her 1995 dance cover version of "Total Eclipse of the Heart", which reached the US and UK top 5, and for representing the United Kingdom in the 2000 Eurovision Song Contest in Stockholm.

Life and career

1964–1993 
French was born in Carlisle, Cumberland, England.

French's first "gig" came at the age of seven, when she was chosen to sing the first verse of "O Little Town of Bethlehem" at the Infants' School Christmas Concert.

From the age of 16, French studied Music and Drama at West Kent College in Tonbridge, Kent, French played the lead role of Laurey in Oklahoma! before moving to London and started auditioning for bands and theatre shows.

1980s-1993: Musical beginnings 
In the mid-1980s, French was part of the duo Whisky and Sofa. They released "Dirty Den" in 1986.

In 1991, French was booked as the leading lady in a series of revue shows on a cruise ship, touring Europe and beyond and covering songs from stage and screen.

In 1992, French provided backing vocals on Rose-Marie's 1992 album, Emotional Exposure. Generally, French had been a session singer for many years before she covered "Total Eclipse of the Heart".

1994–1999: Career peak, Secrets and French Connection 
In 1994, French covered "Total Eclipse of the Heart", a song originally made famous by Bonnie Tyler. The song reached number 5 during a three-month chart run on the UK Singles Chart, selling over 250,000 (UK) copies in the process and earning a silver sales award. In the United States, the song reached number 2, spending six months on the Billboard Hot 100 chart and gaining gold certification from the RIAA. The single also reached number 1 in a number of countries – Japan, Canada, Spain and Brazil – as well as charting in Australia, Germany, Italy, Mexico, the Netherlands, Denmark and Norway. French sold in excess of 5 million copies.

Her second single, "For All We Know", a cover version of the Carpenters' song, peaked at number 42 on the UK Singles Chart. French's debut album, Secrets, was released in 1995 and further singles from the album included "Is There Anybody Out There?", "Did You Ever Really Love Me?" and "Never in a Million Years". French was the record label's biggest artist before they went into liquidation. Secrets sold over 50,000 copies in its first week of sale in the US.

In 1997, French released French Revolution. The single "Te Amo" peaked at number 4 in Brazil. French Revolution achieved success in Japan and Taiwan but French was then dropped by her record label after management reconstructing.

2000–present: Eurovision Song Contest and diversification 

At the 2000 Eurovision Song Contest, French represented the United Kingdom in the Eurovision Song Contest with "Don't Play That Song Again". The song was selected by the British public ahead of seven other finalists on radio and TV. French finished the contest in 16th place. The track entered at number 34 in the UK chart.

French signed to Jim Steinman's Ravenous Records label for a short period in 2000, during which time she recorded "Lovers Again" and "Two Out of Three Ain't Bad", neither of which were ever commercially released.

In 2003, French was one of nine contestants on a special Eurovision edition of BBC Television's The Weakest Link. Joining Sonia, Lyn Paul, James Fox, Katie Boyle, Bobby Gee, Jessica Garlick, Katrina Leskanich and Jemini on the show hosted by Anne Robinson, French won the event and was declared 'The Strongest Link' raising £13,000 for cancer research, having lost her father to cancer in 1997.

In 2004, French released "I Surrender" and in 2005, "Calling Out My Name". "I Surrender" charted on the EuroNRG Top 40 chart

In 2007 French was cast as understudy for the original London cast of Menopause the Musical, starring Su Pollard.  She was subsequently part of all the UK and Irish productions, and has played three out of the four roles throughout her connection with the show, elevating to being cast in the main roles.

In 2008, French took part in her first pantomime, playing Queen Genevieve in Sleeping Beauty at Chipping Norton Theatre. The pantomime gained great reviews, making it into the top 10 pantomimes in the UK in The Daily Telegraph newspaper. In 2009, French played Fairy Godmother in Cinderella for New Pantomime Productions.

In 2009 a special edition of French's second album, French Revolution, became available. The re-release contained seventeen tracks and included all three of her most recent singles along with a previously unreleased version of "Total Eclipse of the Heart".

In August 2010 French toured the UK in the musical Annie, performing eight different roles every night in the show's long run, and was understudy for the role of Miss Hannigan, played by Su Pollard.

In 2014, 20 years after the success of "Total Eclipse of the Heart'", Mike Stock and French have started working together again, recording new tracks for his label Modal Production Group (MPG Ltd). The first release from the studio session was the dance number "This Love". According to Stock, "the song's message is a celebration of love and commitment".

Personal life 
French was born in Carlisle to Joseph and Eileen. She has two sisters, Allison and Carolyn, and a brother, Timothy, who is a songwriter. The French family moved when Nicki was four and settled in Tenterden, Kent. She attended Homewood School and West Kent College in Tonbridge.

French married Gavin Mallett, a professional musician, in July 1993 at St. Mildred's Church, Tenterden. The couple resided in Middlesex. They are now divorced.

Discography

Studio albums

Mini albums

Compilation albums

Singles

Other releases 
 1995: "Rocking Around the Christmas Tree" (available on vinyl and dance compilations) (Avex Records)
 2000: "When You Walk in the Room" (on Euro2000 album as Paris) (Dominion Records)
 2000: "The One and Only" (on Euro2000 album as Paris) (Dominion Records)
 2000: "Will You Still Love Me Tomorrow?" (on Euro2000 album as Paris) (Dominion Records)
 2005: "Private Dancer" (for Gayfest album 2005) (Klone Records)

References

External links 

1964 births
British disco musicians
Eurodance musicians
British hi-NRG musicians
Eurovision Song Contest entrants for the United Kingdom
Eurovision Song Contest entrants of 2000
Living people
People from Carlisle, Cumbria
People from Tenterden
Musicians from Kent
English women pop singers